Luce Pietri (née Gascoin) is a French historian and scholar of late antiquity.

Education 
Pietri attended the Lycée Thiers in Marseille (Khâgne 1950–51) and École normale supérieure de jeunes filles in 1952.

Career 
Pietri is known for her work on late antique history and early Christianity, especially the history of Gaul, and prosopography. She has also published editions of the hagiographies of Gregory of Tours.

In 1992-93 she was appointed as a Professor at the Paris-Sorbonne University. During the 1990s, she was the director of Centre Lenain de Tillemont at the Paris-Sorbonne University.

Personal life 
She married the historian Charles Pietri, with whom she had three children.

Selected publications 

 (1975) La topographie chrétienne des cités de la Gaule des origines à la fin du VIIe siècle. Paris: Publications du Centre de Recherches sur l'Antiquité tardive et le Haut Moyen-âge.
 (1983) La ville de Tours du IVe au VIe siècle. Naissance d'une cité chrétienne. Rome, Publications de l'École Française de Rome.
 (1984–85) ed. with Marc Venard. Le monde et son histoire, 2 vols. Paris: Robert Laffont.
 (1991-2001) ed. with Charles Pietri, André Vauchez, Marc Venard, and Jean-Marie Mayeur. Histoire du christianisme des origines à nos jours, 14 vols. Paris: Desclée.
 (2000) Prosopographie chrétienne du Bas-Empire: Prosopographie de l'Italie chrétienne (313-604). Rome: Publications de l'École Française de Rome. 
 (2013) Prosopographie chrétienne du Bas-Empire: La Gaule chrétienne (314-614). Paris: ACHCByz. 2013.
 (2016) Grégoire de Tours. La Gloire des martyrs [text, translation and commentary]. Paris: Les Belles Lettres.
 (2016) Grégoire de Tours. La Vie des Pères [text, translation and commentary], Paris: Les Belles Lettres.

References 

21st-century French historians
Commandeurs of the Ordre des Palmes Académiques
1939 births
Academic staff of Paris-Sorbonne University
Living people
Patristic scholars
20th-century French historians